Mfon Udoh  (born 14 March 1992) is a Nigerian footballer who plays as a forward for Bangladesh Premier League club Sheikh Russel KC and the Nigeria national team. He has been described as a complete forward who possesses pace, good positioning, natural finishing as well as the ability to provide assists. He is a "fox in the box" type of player, difficult to stop once in the penalty area. He currently holds the record for highest number of goals scored in the Nigerian Premier Football League in a single season. He is also the first player to score over 35 goals in two consecutive seasons in Nigeria. Between 2012 and 2014, he scored 39 goals in the regular league and 3 in national cup competitions, for a total of 41 goals in two seasons. He was the highest goal scorer in the 2016 CAF champions league with nine goals and was all scored in the group stage of the competition.

Club career

Early career
Mfon began his youth career with Diamond Stars Academy then at Calabar (UNICEM) Rovers of the Nigeria National League, the former youth club of  Finidi George. He would go on to score 8 goals in his first season for the Rovers in 2011-2012 season, finishing as their top marksman in all competitions.

Akwa United F.C
In the 2012-2013 season he transferred to Akwa United F.C., his hometown club in the Nigerian Premier Division. On 31 March 2013 few weeks after turning twenty years, he scored his first ever goal at the top level of Nigerian football. On 3 August 2013 he received the League Bloggers Award for the best player during the month of July. He would go on to complete the regular season with 16 goals to his name, among them 8 crucial away goals to help 'the Promise Keepers' escape relegation. He finished the season once more as the top marksman for his club and 3rd highest overall in the league. The performances by the then 20-year-old attracted the attention of top clubs in the league, among them two-time African champions Enyimba.

Enyimba F.C

2013-2014
After surprising many with his performances during his first NPFL season, Udoh earned a transfer to two-time African Champions League winners Enyimba for an undisclosed amount. He was given the number 10 shirt and registered for both the Nigerian NPFL and African Champions League competitions. Enyimba presented the biggest opportunity for the best of Udoh to be showcased under a good club management and good technical handlers. He set a personal target of 20 goals for the season. He would go on to surpass this target, shattering the previous league record by scoring 23 goals as Enyimba finished second in the league table. He is currently the only player in the history of the Nigerian league to score more than 20 league goals in a single season. Mfon was a recipient of multiple 'player of the week' awards for scoring very vital goals and assists throughout the year. He scored a total of 6 braces throughout the campaign, including in the last game against Kano Pillars to extend Enyimba's unbeaten streak to seven games, ending the season on a high note. At the end of the season he received the golden boot for NPFL Top Scorer, award for NPFL Player of the season and the League Bloggers Player of the season.

2014-2015
Mfon scored the only goal in the 1-0 win over Bayelsa Utd to give Enyimba their first league win of the season. He would then score a trademark goal against Taraba Utd by capitalizing on lapse in communication between the defenders to give Enyimba a crucial away win. In the game against Sharks in Aba, Mfon scored a brace to bring his tally to 4 goals. Following injury, Mfon was unavailable for matches until the last few games of the season. He scored the only goal through a superb solo-run in a crucial away derby against Abia Warriors, to help Enyimba win the 2015 NPFL season with a game to spare.

2016
After electing to remain with Enyimba for the 2016 season, Mfon scored a brace in the second leg of the 2016 CAF Champions league qualifying game against Vipers FC. He scored another brace in the next round of the competition against Vital'o FC in an assured 5-1 home victory in Aba. In the final qualifying round, Udoh netted a hat-trick in the first leg against Etoile du Sahel for a convincing 3-0 win in Aba. With new coach Paul Aigbogun using a different tactical approach for the NPFL, Udoh was deployed as a right-winger (RW) in league games. Combined with injuries and reduced appearances upfront he suffered his first scoring drought of his career. Incidentally, with Enyimba's elimination from the CAF Champions league, Mfon's form improved as he scored on matchdays 33 & 35. To somewhat vindicate his local form, he ended the season as the top scorer in the CAF champions league with a total of 9 goals. His feat in the continental competition led to his nomination for the award of CAF African footballer of the year at the end of 2016.

2017
Following the departure of Chinedu Udoji to Kano Pillars in December 2016, Mfon Udoh was named the captain of Enyimba F.C.

On 14 September 2018, he announced his departure after seeing off his contract with the club.

Akwa United 
Mfon Udoh joined Akwa United for the 2018–19 NPFL season where he helped them finish fourth at the Super 6.

FC Tulsa 
On 14 January 2020, USL Championship side FC Tulsa announced the signing of Mfon Udoh alongside Solomon Kwambe from Lobi Stars. He made his league debut against Austin Bold but ended up making just four appearances for the American club.

Return to Akwa United 
Udoh rejoined his hometown club Akwa United in December 2020 and marked his return with a goal in a 2–1 loss to Heartland in the 2020–21 season.

International career
In November 2014 he was called up to a friendly game between Nigerian and Ghanaian home-based teams. He made his first appearance for the national team as a 45th-minute substitute.

International goals
Scores and results list Nigeria's goal tally first.

Honours

Club
 Enyimba: 
 Nigeria Professional Football League: Winners, 2015
 Aiteo Cup:
Winners, 2014

Individual
Nigerian Premier League Top Scorer (1): 2013-2014
Enyimba top scorer: 2013-2014
Nigerian League Bloggers (Monthly) Award (1): August 2013
NPFL Player of the Year Award (1): 2014
Nigerian League Bloggers Player of the Season: 2013-2014
CAF Champions League 2016 Top Scorer (9 goals): 2016

References

External links
Mfon Udoh at Footballdatabase

1992 births
Living people
Nigerian footballers
Nigeria Professional Football League players
Association football forwards
Enyimba F.C. players
Nigeria international footballers
FC Tulsa players
Akwa United F.C. players
Calabar Rovers F.C. players
Nigerian expatriate sportspeople in the United States
Nigerian expatriate footballers
Expatriate soccer players in the United States
USL Championship players
Saif SC players